Lucas De Rossi (born 16 August 1995 in Marseille) is a French cyclist, who currently rides for UCI Continental team .

Major results
2016
 10th Overall Tour of Taihu Lake
2017
 9th Overall Volta a Portugal do Futuro
1st  Young rider classification
2019
 5th Overall Tour of Almaty
2020
 5th  Overall Tour of Bulgaria

References

External links

1995 births
Living people
French male cyclists
Cyclists from Marseille